María Izquierdo Rojo (born 13 September 1946 in Oviedo) is a Spanish politician of the Spanish Socialist Workers' Party (Partido Socialista Obrero Español (PSOE)). She was a member of the Spanish Congress of Deputies in 1977–1979 (the Constituent Congress), 1979–1982 (the 1st Congress) and 1986–1989 (the 3rd Congress), representing Granada. She was a member of the European Parliament from 1989 to 2004.

In 2018 she was one of a group of eleven women honoured by the city of Granada for having enabled the  peaceful transition to democracy in the city forty years earlier. A conference was held entitled "Granadinas por la libertad: once figuras femeninas para la democracia española". 

Speaking on television in 2018 she said "Me he pasado los cincuenta años primeros años de mi vida discriminada por ser mujer, y los siguientes haGranadinas por la libertad: once figuras femeninas para la democracia española"sta hoy discriminada por ser mayor" ("I have spent the first fifty years of my life discriminated against because I am a woman, and the following until today discriminated against because I am older").

References

External links
Personal website

1946 births
Living people
People from Oviedo
Women members of the Congress of Deputies (Spain)
Members of the constituent Congress of Deputies (Spain)
Members of the 1st Congress of Deputies (Spain)
Members of the 3rd Congress of Deputies (Spain)
Spanish Socialist Workers' Party MEPs
Spanish Socialist Workers' Party politicians
MEPs for Spain 1989–1994
MEPs for Spain 1994–1999
MEPs for Spain 1999–2004
20th-century women MEPs for Spain
21st-century women MEPs for Spain